Lake Shipp is located on the Chain of Lakes in Winter Haven, Florida.  It is almost round in shape. This lake is a natural freshwater lake with a  surface area. This lake is bordered on the north, northwest and the southwest sides by residential areas. On the east and part of the southeast are warehouses and business buildings. William G. Roe Park is on the southeast shore and Sertoma Park, officially called Lake Shipp Park, is on the west side of Lake Shipp.

The public has considerable public access to portions of the shore of this lake, although there are no public swimming areas. Two parks provide access. Lake Shipp Park, also known as Sertoma Park, is along much of the west side of Lake Shipp. This park has four shelterhouses, thirteen picnic tables, five baseball fields, two soccer fields, a playground, a boat ramp, canoe access to the lake and fishing access. The other park, William G. Roe Park, is on the southwest side of the lake. This park has a large boat launching area. Also, boaters can use two canals leaving Lake Shipp to access other area lakes. The canal to the south meanders for miles to the south and southwest.

The Hook and Bullet site says Lake Shipp has the following fishes: pumpkinseed, channel catfish, bullhead, bluegill, redear sunfish, largemouth bass, redbreast sunfish.

References

Shipp